Following poor results for the Labour Party in the local elections in England on 4 May 2006, British Prime Minister Tony Blair held a cabinet reshuffle the following day.

Changes

Secretary of State for the Home Department
John Reid moved from Defence to become the new Home Secretary, following Blair's decision to remove Charles Clarke from the position. Clarke refused the offer of other Cabinet positions and returned to the back benches. This was Reid's ninth cabinet position in nine years.

Secretary of State for Foreign and Commonwealth Affairs
Margaret Beckett, previously Secretary of State for Environment, Food and Rural Affairs, was promoted to become Britain's first ever female Foreign Secretary, replacing Jack Straw. Straw had held the prominent position from 2001 and was heavily involved in the War on terror. Straw's departure from his role as Foreign Secretary had not been widely predicted, but the move apparently came at his own request for a change following nearly a decade of service in front-line positions in the Cabinet, first as Home Secretary and then as Foreign Secretary although others have argued that Straw was sacked for his growing allegiance with Gordon Brown and dismissal of military action against Iran. Straw became Leader of the House of Commons and Lord Privy Seal, and also took over responsibility for reform of the House of Lords and political party funding.

Deputy Prime Minister and First Secretary of State
John Prescott remained as Deputy Prime Minister and First Secretary of State, but was stripped of all the departmental ministerial responsibilities formerly associated with the office, apparently at his own request, following the revelation that he had an affair with his secretary. These responsibilities were taken over by Ruth Kelly under the new title of Secretary of State for Communities and Local Government.

Leader of the House of Commons, Lords Reform and Party Funding
Jack Straw, formerly Foreign Secretary, took over the Leadership of the House of Commons and the sinecure office of Lord Privy Seal from Geoff Hoon (who became Minister of State for Europe). Responsibility for Reform of the House of Lords and political party funding was transferred from the Secretary of State for Constitutional Affairs.

Secretary of State for Trade and Industry
Alistair Darling, formerly both the Secretary of State for Transport and the Secretary of State for Scotland, replaced Alan Johnson as the Secretary of State for Trade and Industry.  Johnson was moved to become Secretary of State for Education and Skills.

Cabinet Office and Social Exclusion Minister and Chancellor of the Duchy of Lancaster
Hilary Armstrong moved from her former function as Chief Whip and Parliamentary Secretary to the Treasury to become Minister for the Cabinet Office and Minister for Social Exclusion.  She also filled the traditional sinecure office of Chancellor of the Duchy of Lancaster which had been vacant since John Hutton was promoted to replace David Blunkett as Secretary of State for Work and Pensions in November 2005.

Secretary of State for Education and Skills
Alan Johnson, formerly Secretary of State for Trade and Industry, became the new Secretary of State for Education and Skills. He replaced Ruth Kelly, who moved to the new office of Secretary of State for Communities and Local Government.

Secretary of State for Communities and Local Government
Ruth Kelly, formerly Secretary of State for Education and Skills, became the new Secretary of State for Communities and Local Government. This department took over some functions from the Home Office and the Department of Trade and Industry, especially connected with equality legislation, but the bulk of the department was made up of the former Office of the Deputy Prime Minister, which was run by John Prescott before he lost his departmental responsibilities in the reshuffle, and also takes over the responsibilities of David Miliband, former Minister of State for Communities and Local Government.

Secretary of State for Environment, Food and Rural Affairs
David Miliband moved from his position in the Cabinet as Minister of State for Communities and Local Government to become the new Secretary of State for Environment, Food and Rural Affairs. He replaced Margaret Beckett, who was promoted to become Foreign Secretary.

Secretary of State for Defence
Des Browne replaced John Reid as Secretary of State for Defence. He was previously Chief Secretary to the Treasury, another Cabinet position.  Reid was promoted to become Home Secretary.

Secretary of State for Transport and Secretary of State for Scotland
The roles of Secretary of State for Transport and Secretary of State for Scotland were filled by Douglas Alexander.  Both of these positions were formerly held by Alistair Darling, who became Secretary of State for Trade and Industry.

Minister without Portfolio and Party Chairman
Hazel Blears replaced Ian McCartney as Minister without Portfolio and Chairman of the Labour Party.  McCartney was demoted to become Minister of State for Trade, attending the Cabinet, but not actively voting in it.

Chief Whip and Parliamentary Secretary to the Treasury
The positions of Chief Whip and Parliamentary Secretary to the Treasury were given to Jacqui Smith, replacing Hilary Armstrong.  Smith was previously Minister of State for Schools in the Department for Education and Skills.  Armstrong became Minister of State for the Cabinet Office and for "Social Exclusion", and Chancellor of the Duchy of Lancaster

Chief Secretary to the Treasury
Stephen Timms was promoted to Cabinet rank to become the new Chief Secretary to the Treasury, replacing Des Browne.  Timms had served in the Treasury twice before, in the more junior office of Financial Secretary to the Treasury, and was Minister for Pensions before the reshuffle.  This was Timms' first Cabinet appointment.

Minister for Europe, attending Cabinet
Geoff Hoon, formerly Leader of the House of Commons and Lord Privy Seal, became the new Minister for Europe at the Foreign Office.  Initial reports billed him as "Secretary of State for Europe", which may have been his understanding at the time he left Downing Street. Although he continues to attend the Cabinet, he had lost his Cabinet vote, and his new position was a substantial demotion.

Cabinet from 5 May 2006

References
Notes

Sources
 Official list of cabinet and junior ministers after the changes, from the 10 Downing Street website

Cabinet reshuffles in the United Kingdom
Cabinet reshuffle, May 2006
Cabinet reshuffle
Tony Blair
May 2006 events in the United Kingdom